V S Raghavan (18 February 1925 – 24 January 2015) was an Indian actor, who has acted both in Tamil films as well as television. He started his career as a dramatist and stage actor and went on to act as a character actor in films, starting with Vairamali (1954) and over 1000 films in all.  He has also acted in numerous television series. He died on 24 January 2015.

Early life and education
Born in Vembakkam village, near Singaperumal Koil near Chengleput, where he spent early part of his childhood, later for three years he lived in Mylapore neighbourhood of Chennai, and studied at the P S High School. Subsequently, he studied at St Columbus Higher Secondary School, Chengalpattu, followed by two years in Madras Christian College, Chennai. However, as he finished his school the death of his father prompted his mother to shift from native village to move to Vellala Street in Purasawalkam, Chennai where his elder sister lived.

Career
V S Raghavan started his career in 1942, as a sub-editor for Malathi magazine run by humourist Thumilan (N Ramaswamy), and after it closed he joined a printing press. At the press a group of fellow employees used to do amateur stage plays, which led him to act in some plays including some Hindi plays. Earlier, he had acted in YMIA Fine Arts' theatre group's play Vairamalai, written by Thottakara Viswanathan, staged at the YMCA, and when the production adapted the stage play into a film, he played the same role in it, thus made his film début in 1954. In the same year, he made his debut as a dramatist and started the Indian National Artists (INA) with four other friends like Malli, Vadiraj, Nataraj and K Balachander. The INA staged plays at reputed Sabhas in Chennai.

Veteran director K Balachander who has won several accolades for memorable films was part of his troupe where he acted and wrote scripts.
The INA closed down a decade later and Raghavan entered the cinema world and acted in supporting roles. He has acted in around 1000 films and has also featured in many MGR films. He is also very well known for his role in the TV serial Anni created by K Balachander.

Partial filmography

 Vaira Malai (1954)
 Kaalam Maaripochu (1955)
 Kalyanam Seydhukko (1955)
 Samaya Sanjeevi (1957) - Also Director
 Sarangadhara (1957)
 Manaiviey Manidhanin Manikkam (1959)
 Kaathirundha Kangal (1962)
 Nenjil Or Aalayam (1962)
 Sumaithaangi (1962) 
 Káthirunda Kangal (1962) 
 Vanambadi (1962) 
 Kalai Kovil (1964) 
 Bommai (1964) 
 Kadhalikka Neramillai (1964)
 Karnan (1964)
 Nadu Iravil(1965)
 Chitthi (1966) 
 Ramu (1966 film) (1966) 
 Gowri Kalyanam (1966) 
 Pesum Dheivam (1967) 
 Anubavam Pudhumai (1967) 
 Ethirigal Jakkirathai (1967)
 Kadhalithal Podhuma (1967)
 Nenjirukkum Varai (1967) 
 Ninaivil Nindraval (1967)
 Pattanathil Bhootham (1967)
 Kallum Kanniyagum (1968)
 Neelagiri Express (1968)
 Oli Vilakku (1968) 
 Galatta Kalyanam (1968) 
 Lakshmi Kalyanam (1968) 
 Machan (1968) 
 Uyarndha Manidhan (1968) 
 Ethir Neechal (1968) 
 Iru Kodugal (1969)
 Aayiram Poi (1969) 
 Ethiroli (1970) 
 Penn Deivam (1970) 
 Welcome Back Gandhi (1970) 
 Vilaiyaattu Pillai (1970) 
 Engal Thangam (1970) 
 Maanavan (1970) 
 Balan (1970)
 Panama Paasama
 Savale Samali
 Uyir (1971)
 Punnagai (1971)
 Arunodhayam (1971) 
 Avalukendru Or Manam (1971) 
 Savaale Samali (1971) 
 Moondru Dheivangal (1971) 
 Iru Thuruvam (1971)
 Nootrukku Nooru (1971) 
 Needhikku Thalaivanangu (1972) 
 Raman Thediya Seethai (1972 film) (1972) 
 Sange Muzhangu (1972) 
 Vazhaiyadi Vazhai (1972)
 Nawab Naarkali (1972) 
 Kurathi Magan (1972)
 Neethikku Thalai Vanangu
 Urimaikural (1974) 
 En Magan (1974) 
 Gumasthavin Magal (1974) 
 Sirithu Vazha Vendum (1974) 
 Athaiya Mamiya (1974) 
 Sivagamiyin Selvan (1974) 
 Gumasthavin Magal (1974)
 Ellorum Nallavare (1975)
 Pallandu Vazhga (1975) 
 Ninaithadhai Mudippavan (1975) 
 Idhayakkani (1975) 
 Naalai Namadhe (1975) 
 Dasavatharam (1976)
 Mayor Meenakshi (1976)
 Uzhaikkum Karangal (1976) 
 Sri Krishna Leela (1977)
 Madhuraiyai Meetta Sundharapandiyan (1978) 
 Varuvan Vadivelan (1978) 
 Vaazhkai Alaigal (1978) 
 Aayiram Jenmangal (1978)
 Kalyanaraman (1979)
 Azhage Unnai Aarathikkiren (1979) 
 Devi Dharisanam (1980) 
 Gnana Kuzhandhai (1979)
 Rishi Moolam (1980) 
 Sathya Sundharam (1981) 
 Kalthoon (1981) 
 Sangili (film) (1982) 
 Thyagi (1982) 
 Hitler Umanath (1982) 
 Krodham (1982)
 Deviyin Thiruvilaiyadal (1982)
 Rusi (1984)
 Sumai Thaangi
 Simma Soppanam (1984) 
 Thambikku Entha Ooru (1984) 
 Kai Kodukkum Kai (1984) 
 Nalla Thambi (1985)
 Santhosha Kanavukal (1985)
 Navagraha Nayagi (1985) 
 Padikkadha Pannaiyar (1985) 
 Poi Mugangal (1985)
 Naan Sigappu Manithan (1985)
 Sri Raghavendrar (1985)
 Naam Iruvar (1985) 
 Naanum Oru Thozhilali (1986)
 Veerapandiyan (1987) 
 Unnal Mudiyum Thambi (1988)
 Sattathin Marupakkam (1989)
 Avasara Police 100 (1990)
 Idhuthanda Sattam (1992) 
 Hey Ram (2000)
 Love Channel (2001)
 Poovellam Un Vasam (2001)
 Kanna Nalama (2004) 
 Kamaraj (2004)
 Imsai Arasan 23m Pulikesi (2006) - Palace Astrologer
 Arai Enn 305-il Kadavul (2008) (cameo)
 Kudiyarasu (2009) - Raghavan
 Irumbu Kottai Murattu Singam (2010) (cameo)
 Kola Kolaya Mundhirika (2010) 
 Magizhchi (2010)
 Thamizh Padam (2010) 
 Nagaram Marupakkam (2010)
 Kalakalappu (2012) - Maya's Grandfather
 Saguni (2012) - Kamalakannan's Grandfather
 All in All Azhagu Raja (2013) 
 Anna Nee En Deivam (2013) 
 Idharkuthane Aasaipattai Balakumara (2013) - Prayer Song
 Oru Kanniyum Moonu Kalavaanikalum (2014)
 Indru Netru Naalai (2015)
 Kaathadi (2018)

TV serials
 Anni (2003-2005) as Ramanathan's father
 Penn (2006) as Ranganayaki's father
 Rekha IPS (2008 - 2009)
 Bhairavi Aavigalukku Priyamanaval (2012) - 3 Episode
 Valli - Swaminathan (Subbu grandfather; Episode 16-449) 2012-14

Short films
 Alaivarisai (2013)

References

External links
 

Male actors in Tamil cinema
1925 births
2015 deaths
Male actors from Tamil Nadu
Indian male television actors
Indian male stage actors
Tamil male actors
Madras Christian College alumni